The Tuvalu national football team is the international football team of Tuvalu. Football in Tuvalu is played at the club and international level. The Tuvalu national team draws players from the Tuvalu A-Division and trains at the Tuvalu Sports Ground at Funafuti. The national team competes in the Pacific Games, and is controlled by the Tuvalu Islands Football Association (TIFA), which is an associate member of the Oceania Football Confederation (OFC) but not a member of FIFA.

Membership
Tuvalu is a member of the Oceania Football Confederation (OFC), but not of FIFA. In September 2008, Tuvaluan Prime Minister Apisai Ielemia and the President of the Tuvalu Football Association, Tapugao Falefou, visited the headquarters of FIFA in Zurich, hoping to gain full membership in the organisation. In December 2013, OFC General Secretariat Tai Nicholas named Tuvalu's lack of a regulation pitch as the main factor preventing the country from being accepted into FIFA. The Tuvalu Football Association continues to seek membership of FIFA with the Dutch Support Tuvalu Foundation assisting Tuvalu with the FIFA application and with the development of football in Tuvalu. Since November 2016, Tuvalu has been a member of the Confederation of Independent Football Associations (CONIFA) but, as of 2022, is no longer listed as one of their members.

History

1979 South Pacific Games
The Tuvaluan team, captained by Karl Tili, played three international matches at the 1979 South Pacific Games, with Kokea Malu as the coach. In Tuvalu's first international match, they were defeated by Tahiti 18–0; its worst defeat to this day. However, in their next match, the team recorded a large 5–3 victory against Tonga. The victory against Tonga sent the team to the next round, where Tuvalu was defeated by New Caledonia 10–2. The next game was against Kiribati, which was drawn 3–3; however Tuvalu won the penalty shootout 4–2 to advance to the semi-finals of the consolation tournament for fifth place; in that round Tuvalu was defeated by Guam 7–2, who eventually won sixth place after losing the fifth-place match.

2003 South Pacific Games
In a warm-up match for the 2003 South Pacific Games, Tuvalu played a friendly game against Fiji and were defeated 9–0.

Tuvalu also participated in four games at the 2003 South Pacific Games again held in Fiji, with Tim Jerks as the coach. After defeating Kiribati 3–2 in their opening game, Tuvalu played Fiji again, but were defeated with a more respectable 4–0. In the game against Vanuatu, Tuvalu was narrowly defeated 1–0. In the final game of the tournament against Solomon Islands, the Tuvaluan squad was defeated 4–0. Tuvalu finished fourth out of five in Pool A, above Kiribati.

2007 World Cup and OFC Nations Cup qualifications
In 2007, with Toakai Puapua as the coach, and Petio Semaia as the captain, Tuvalu became the first non FIFA member to participate in an official World Cup qualifying match. The situation arose when the regional governing body used the football competition at the 2007 South Pacific Games, as the first stage of the qualification tournament for the 2010 FIFA World Cup and qualification tournament for the 2008 OFC Nations Cup. In Tuvalu's South Pacific Games debut, they were defeated 16–0 by Fiji. However Tuvalu fought hard in the next match against New Caledonia (who were joint leaders of the competition) and only lost 1–0. Tuvalu then drew 1–1 with Tahiti, with a late equaliser from Viliamu Sekifu. In the last group stage match the Cook Islands, coached by Tim Jerks (who had previously coached Tuvalu), defeated them 4–1. Tuvalu finished last in the group with one point.

2011 Pacific Games

In 2011 the Tuvalu National Football Association signed Dutch coach Foppe de Haan as the coach on a part-time and volunteer basis. De Haan previously coached SC Heerenveen, Ajax Cape Town and the Dutch national U-21 team. De Haan began his tenure with a 3–0 victory over Samoa in a warm-up match for the 2011 Pacific Games, and striker Alopua Petoa scored a hat-trick.

De Haan's second match in charge saw a record 4–0 victory recorded over American Samoa in the first match of their 2011 Pacific Games campaign, with another hat-trick from 19-year-old Alopua Petoa. The third match was not as successful, with the side going down 5–1 to Vanuatu. After losing 8–0 to New Caledonia, and 6–1 to Solomon Islands, the Tuvaluan team drew with Guam 1–1. The squad finished equal with Guam in Pool A with four points, which was the best performance by Tuvalu in an international tournament at the time.

De Haan left his post after the tournament to rejoin Heerenveen's youth programme.

Dutch Support Tuvalu Foundation 

The national football team of Tuvalu received support from the Dutch Support Tuvalu Foundation, which is a foundation in the Netherlands.

On 18 August 2013, the Tuvalu national football team went on a three-month tour of the Netherlands. During this tour they played at least 20 friendly matches against local amateur football clubs. Former NAC Breda and De Graafschap coach Leen Looijen was the team's mentor during training in the Netherlands, with the tour organised by the Dutch Support Tuvalu Foundation.

The Tuvalu team and the activities of the Dutch Support Tuvalu Foundation are the focus of Mission Tuvalu (Missie Tuvalu) (2013) a feature documentary directed by Jeroen van den Kroonenberg.

Tuvaluan footballers in New Zealand
Many Tuvaluan footballers have played for clubs in New Zealand. Vaisua Liva and Alopua Petoa joined Waitakere City FC in 2012. Meneua Fakasega and Jerome Funafuti also played for Waitakere City FC. Maalosi Alefaio has played for Te Atatu AFC. Striker Blake Lisk has played for Wellington Phoenix.

CONIFA Membership
In November 2016 Tuvalu became a member of the Confederation of Independent Football Associations (CONIFA).  On 7 March 2018 it was announced that Tuvalu would replace Kiribati in the 2018 ConIFA World Football Cup in London. On 9 June 2018, Tuvalu recorded their biggest ever victory in a 6–1 win over the Chagos Islands. Sometime around 2020, Tuvalu would leave CONIFA and they are no longer listed as members of the organisation.

Historical kits

Sources:

Kit sponsorship

Manager history

Players

Current squad
The following players were called up for the 2019 Pacific Games.

Caps and goals updated as of 18 July 2019 after the game against New Caledonia.

Player records

Players in bold are still active with Tuvalu.

Most appearances

Most goals scored

Competitive record

OFC Nations Cup
Tuvalu has been affiliated with OFC since 2006, so they can play in the competition.

Pacific Games

Pacific Mini Games

ConIFA World Football Cup

Head-to-head record
Up to matches played on 18 July 2019.

Complete international results
Tuvalu's score is shown first

Notes

Honours
Tuvalu A-Division
Winners (1): 2018

See also
 Tuvalu at the Pacific Games
 Tuvalu national under-17 football team

Notes
Footnotes

Citations

External links

 Tuvalu Football
 Dutch Support Tuvalu Foundation (in Dutch, English, French and Spanish)

 
national team
Oceanian national association football teams
Oceanian national and official selection-teams not affiliated to FIFA
CONIFA member associations